Neil Elbridge Gordon (October 7, 1886 – May 30, 1949) was an American chemist and educator. He is known for founding the Journal of Chemical Education (c. 1924) and establishing the Gordon Research Conferences (c. 1931). He held several Chair positions spanning his time at the University of Maryland, Johns Hopkins University, Central College in Missouri, and Wayne State University.

References

20th-century American chemists
1886 births
1949 deaths
Syracuse University alumni
Johns Hopkins University alumni